Religious music (also sacred music) is a type of music that is performed or composed for religious use or through religious influence. It may overlap with ritual music, which is music, sacred or not, performed or composed for or as ritual. Religious songs have been described as a source of strength, as well as a means of easing pain, improving one's mood, and assisting in the discovery of meaning in one's suffering. While style and genre vary broadly across traditions, religious groups still share a variety of musical practices and techniques.

Religious music takes on many forms and varies throughout cultures. Religions such as Islam, Judaism, and Sinism demonstrate this, splitting off into different forms and styles of music that depend on varying religious practices. Religious music across cultures depicts its use of similar instruments, used in accordance to create these melodies. drums (and drumming), for example, is seen commonly in numerous religions such as Rastafari and Sinism, while wind instruments (horn, saxophone, trumpet and variations of such) can be commonly found in Islam and Judaism.

Throughout each religion, each form of Religious music, within the specific religion, differs for a different purpose. For example, in Islamic Music, some types of music are used for prayer while others are used for celebrations. Similarly, a variation like this is shared between many other religions.

Music plays a significant role in many religions. In some religions, such as Buddhism, music helps people calm their minds and focus before meditation. In Sikh music, known as kirtan, the music helps people connect with the teachings of the religion and with God. Some other religions, such as Islam, use music to recite the word of their holy book. Some religions relate their music to non-religious musicians. For example, Rastafarian music heavily relates to reggae music. Religious music helps those of all religions connect with their faith and remember their religious values.

Buddhist music 

Buddhist music is music created for or inspired by Buddhism and part of Buddhist art.

Buddhist chanting
Buddhist chanting is a form of musical verse or incantation, which is similar to religious recitations of other faiths. Buddhist chanting is the traditional means of preparing the mind for meditation, especially as part of formal practice (in either a lay or monastic context). Some Buddhist traditions also use chanting as a form of devotional practices.

Apart from chanting, in certain Buddhist traditions, offerings of music are given in honor of the Triple Gem, consisting of traditional music performed by specialists, or of the ritual music that accompanies the chanting. One significant example lies in Sri Lankan tradition, where a traditional ceremony is performed by drummers as a musical offering, also popularly known as "Sabda-Puja".

Christian music

According to some scholars, the earliest music in the Christian Church came from Jewish worship music, with some additional Syriac influence. It is believed that this music lay somewhere between singing and speaking, or speaking with an understood ritual cadence. However, there is another opinion that the roots of early Christian music come from the early ascetic monastic orders.

Hymns

Christian music has diversified over time, reflecting both its centuries-old roots as well as more contemporary musical styles. Thousands of traditionally-styled songs of praise or worship, called "hymns" (from the Greek word hymnos meaning, "song of praise"), were written over hundreds of years. Eventually, these songs were compiled into books called "hymnals", from which pastors and congregants would read during Christian services – a practice that continues in many churches today.

Prior to the eighteenth century, Christian hymnals were published as standalone texts without accompanying musical scores. The first American hymnal with both text and song was published in 1831. In Europe, the Church of England did not officially allow hymns to be sung until 1820. Originally, hymns were sung by "lining out" the lyrics, meaning, the pastor would sing a line, and then the congregation would repeat it. This was done because, at that time, books were expensive, so it was economical to provide the pastor of a church with one copy from which everyone could sing.

Christian Music in the Modern Era

Modern methods of publication have made hymnals much more accessible to the public today than previously. The practice of "lining out" the lyrics of hymns has therefore largely fallen away, although it continues to be practiced in some traditional churches. In the twentieth century, Christian music has developed to reflect the emergence of a diverse array of musical genres including rock, metal, pop, jazz, contemporary, rap, spiritual, country, blues, and gospel. The use of specific genres and styles of music in church services today varies across Christian denominations and according to the personal preference of pastors and church members. As of the late twentieth century, there has been a widespread preference in less traditional churches towards using contemporary music (particularly, "praise and worship" songs, which attempt to preserve the religious intent of hymns but use contemporary lyrics and a more modern musical sound instead) as well as gospel and spiritual music.

Hindu music 

Hindu music is music created for or influenced by Hinduism. It includes Carnatic music, Indian classical music, Hindustani classical music, Kirtan, Bhajan and other musical genres. Raagas are a common form of Hindu music in classical India. Vedas are also in Hindu music.

A raga or raag (IAST: rāga; also raaga or ragam; literally "coloring, tingeing, dyeing") is a melodic framework for improvisation akin to a melodic mode in Indian classical music.

Islamic music 

Islamic music comes in many forms. Each form is used for different purposes as one may be for prayers and complete focus towards Allah (God) and while the other is entertainment, however still including that religious aspect.

Prayer 
Islamic prayer is a type of religious music that Muslims use when they pray and worship Allah. These prayers (in Arabic, prayer is Salah) that occur five times a day. These prayers are conducted by facing Mecca while standing, having both knees to the ground, and bowing. During prayer, recitations are usually of the Islamic holy book: the Quran. Throughout the day, in Mecca, these prayers connect the Muslim people through a series of melodic prayers that are often amplified throughout the city. In Islam, the implication of prayer, and in this case the Salah, is for ritual since it is believed to be the direct word of God that shall be performed as a collective, as well as individually.

Sufi Music 
Sufism, Islam's mystical dimension, advocates peace, tolerance, and pluralism, as well as music as a means of improving one's relationship with God. Sufi music aims to bring listeners closer to God. The deep urge to dissolve the physical realm and transcend into the spiritual universe, which occurs through the practice of listening to music, chanting, and whirling, and culminating in spiritual ecstasy, lies at the heart of Sufi lyrics. Because music is viewed as a tool for the believer to grow closer to the holy, sound and music are important to the basic experience of Sufism. Sufi music is therefore music created by and for the soul.

Naat 
The other form of Islamic music is Naat. The word Naat has Arabic origins and translates to praise. A poem that praises the Islamic Prophet Muhammad is referred to as Naat (نعت) in Urdu. First naat dates back to the era of Muhammad and was written in Arabic. It later spread throughout the world and reached various literatures including Urdu, Punjabi, Sindhi, Pashto, Turkish, Seraiki and more. Naat-Khuwan or Sana-Khuwan are known as those who recite Naat.

Instruments 

 Chordophones, or stringed instruments
 Zornā and gayta as aerophones, or wind instruments
 Būq, or horn
 Nafīr, or long trumpet
 Idiophones, membranophones, tambourines, or frame drums

Melodic Organization 
Islamic music is monophonic, meaning it has only one melody line. Everything in performance is based on the refinement of the melodic line and the complexity of the beat. Although a simple arrangement of notes, octaves, fifths, and fourths, usually below the melody notes, may be used as ornamentation, the concept of harmony is absent. Microtonality and the variety of intervals used are two components that contribute to the melody's enrichment. As a result, the three-quarter tone, which was first used in Islamic music in the ninth or tenth centuries, coexists with bigger and smaller intervals. Musicians have a keen sensitivity to pitch variations, often altering even the perfect consonances, the fourth and fifth, somewhat.

History of Islamic prayer 
Riccold De Monte, a famous travel writer, stated in the year 1228, "What shall I say of their prayer? For they pray with such concentration and devotion that I was astonished when I was able to see it personally and observe it with my own eyes." The origin of the art of prayer in all Abrahamic religions is to glorify God and the same goes for Islam. The Al Salat is the most widely used word to mean institutionalized prayer and is one of the oldest forms of prayer in Islam. Islamic prayer, traditions, and ideals had influence from these Abrahamic religions. The time of origination of Salah came from Muhammad in a cave as he began to worship Allah (God). It is believed that through this act of worship Mohammad interacted with the Abrahamic prophet Moses. Now these "prayers" come in the form of recitations of the Quran and poems written by prophets of the faith.

Spread of Islamic prayer 
Besides the spread of Islam through Arabia by prophets, it spread through trade routes like the Silk Road and through conflicts of war. Through the Silk Road traders and members of the early Muslim faith were able to go to countries such as China and create mosques around 627 C. E. As men from the Middle East went to China they would marry these Asian women, which led to a spreading of the faith and traditions of Islam in multiplicities. The Crusades in the 9th and 10th centuries encouraged the spread of Islam through the invasions of Latin Christian soldiers and Muslim soldiers into each other's lands. The whole conflict began on the premises of a Holy Land and which group of people owned these lands that led to these foes invading their respective lands. As the religion itself spread so did its implications of ritual, such as prayer.

Relation of Islamic Music to Other Cultures 
Both musical theory and practice illustrate the relationship between Islamic and Western music. Many Greek treatises had been translated into Arabic by the 9th century. Greek musical texts were maintained in Arabic culture, and the majority of those that reached the West did so in their Arabic translations. Arab philosophers adopted Greek models and often improved on them. The Muslim conquest of Spain and Portugal, as well as the Crusades to the Middle East, introduced Europeans to Arabic theoretical works and thriving Islamic art music. Moreover, Arab invaders entered India as early as 711 AD, while Mongol and Turkmen forces eventually invaded the Middle East, bringing Islamic and Far Eastern music together. There are parallels between India's and the Middle East's modal systems, as well as some cosmological and ethical ideas of music.

Jewish music 

Jewish music is the shared melody of religious Jewish communities. Its influence spreads across the globe, originating in the Middle East, where music principles differ from those of the Western world, emphasizing rhythmic development over harmony. There are three sections into which Jewish music can be separated: Ashkenazic music, Sephardic music, and Mizrahi music.

Ashkenazic 
The most prevalent form of Ashkenazic music is Klezmer, which is typically sung in Yiddish. Klezmer often refers to the Jewish instrumentalist, specifically focusing on Ashkenazic melodies and music; this genre was common among European Jewish traveling musicians. Klezmer music was and continues to be used primarily at Jewish social gatherings. Weddings, however, are the main venue for this genre. Klezmer fundamentally dates back to the nineteenth century; there are a multitude of Klezmer musicians whose ages range from 50 to 80, but there is evidence that dates it back to centuries prior. Klezmer music features a myriad of various instruments that can be seen in many modern forms of music today, such as violin, drums and cymbals, accordion, cello, clarinet, and saxophone.

Sephardic 
Sephardic music encompasses music that is of Mediterranean origin, including Spain, Turkey, and Greece. Sephardic music is typically sung in Ladino, or a Judeo-Spanish dialect. It demonstrates music styles that are reminiscent of Mediterranean rhythms and melodies. This genre touches on romance, life, and religious traditions, and is typically associated with women and women's singing. Women tend to sing these songs with no additional harmony or instruments. Sephardic music originates from Jews that lived in medieval Spain and Portugal, and it spread following Sephardic Jews' expulsion from Spain and Portugal in the late 15th century.

Mizrahi 
Mizrahi music contains elements of Middle Eastern, European, and North African music, traditionally sung in Hebrew. Mizrahi Jews are communities of Jewish people from the Middle East and North Africa. This style of music was widely unpopular, with Ashkenazic music being prevalent in most Jewish communities. This style, however, grew in popularity in the 1970s. Mizrahi music demonstrates many Arabic elements, showcasing instruments such as the oud, kanun, and the darbuka. Other instrumental elements include guitar, vocal trills, and electronic instruments.

Neopagan music 

Neopagan music is music created for or influenced by modern Paganism. It has appeared in many styles and genres, including folk music, classical music, singer-songwriter, post-punk, heavy metal and ambient music.

Rastafarian music

Origin 
Rastafari appeared in Jamaica in the 1930s as an energetic and spirited movement. It is classed as a religion, by non-rastafarians, due to the principles the movement is built upon. Nevertheless, some Rastafarians viewed their movement as a way of life for their supporters. The Rastafarian way of life represents the identity recreation of being African. As the movement spread to South Africa and Jamaica, this caused confusion about what Rastafarians believed due to the combination of other ideologies and religions being incorporated into the religion. However, Christianity being the structure for the religion, interpreted parts of the Bible differently

Rastafarian music is persistently tied to reggae music, an earlier form of Jamaican music. As reggae continues to be spread throughout the world, creators are beginning to change the original reggae sound and Rastafarian ideology incorporated. Various reggae songs representing Rastafarian culture through lyrics, themes, and symbolism.

Rastafarian Drumming 
Earlier origins of Rastafarian music connected to the high usage of drums. The play of drums represents a form of communication between Rastafarian gods and their supporters. Drumming would commonly take place during a reasoning session, the gathering of Rastafarians to chant, pray, and sing in the home of a Rasta or a community center. Count Ossie, a Rastafarian drum player revealed various rhythmic patterns after noticing the escalated sensation of drumming during prayer. Incorporation of the drums in spiritual sessions stems from the African drumming and Africans and Rastafarians seek for cultural identity. Majority of slaves not having religious belief, coincidentally Rastafarians having no music led to the integration of the groups. This increased the spread of the Rastafarian religion as slaves gained a new religion, and Rastafarians enjoyed Buru music, Afro-Jamaican rhythm music.

Expansion 
Bob Marley, an iconic influence, also a member of Rastafarian was an significant reason to the expansion of Rastafarian music spreading across the world.  Through religious messages portrayed through his lyrics the religion was beginning to become popular. Marley expressing his opinions on political matters, justice, and peace increased the awareness of the unique beliefs of Rastafari. North Americans were able to identify unique features of Rastafarians such as dreadlocks, manner of speaking, and the consumption of marijuana. The death of the famous star was unfortunate, certainly for the Rastafarians as Marley was the outlet for their culture and music to the rest of the world. The life of Bob Marley continues to be supported as gather to play the Nyabinghi drums and chat at his museum.

Shamanic music 

Shamanic music is music played either by actual shamans as part of their rituals, or by people who, whilst not themselves shamans, wish to evoke the cultural background of shamanism in some way.

Shintō music 

Shintō music (神楽) is ceremonial music for Shinto (神道) which is the native religion of Japan.

Sikh music

Sikh music or Shabad kirtan is Kirtan-style singing of hymns or Shabad from the Sri Guru Granth Sahib Ji, the central text of Sikhism. Its development dates back to the late 16th century as the musical expression of mystical poetry, accompanied by a musical instrument rabab. All the Sikh Gurus sang in the then-prevalent classical and folk music styles, accompanied by stringed and percussion instruments. The Gurus specified the raag for each hymn in the Sikh sacred scripture, the Guru Granth Sahib.

Shabad

Raag 
The Sikh Guru, Sri Guru Granth Sahib Ji, consists of shabads, or passages, written by Sikh Gurus and various other saints and holy men. Before each shabad, a raag is assigned. the raag provides a guideline for how the shabad should be sang. There are 31 raags in Sri Guru Granth Sahib Ji. A raag is a specific set of rules on how to construct a certain melody. Sri Guru Granth Sahib Ji is composed with different raags to match the shabads and teachings of the Sikh Gurus and various holy people.

Instruments 
The Gurus also created numerous musical instruments including the Dilruba, the Sarangi, the Esraj and the Jori.

Rabab 
One of the earliest Sikh instruments to be used was the Rabab. When Guru Nanak Dev Ji, the first Guru of the Sikhs would travel to different areas, his companion Bhai Mardana would always bring a rebab. They would sing Sikh shabads to the residents of each village and Bhai Mardana would play his rebab. In this way, Guru Nanak Dev Ji started the singing of Sikh kirtan.

Jori 
Another Sikh instrument is the Jori. The word jori means pair and the jori is a pair of two drums. The musician playing the jori will use one hand per drum whilst playing the instrument. The instrument was created during the time of the fifth Sikh Guru, Guru Arjun Dev Ji. Originally, one of the most popular drums used in South Asia in the 16th century was the Mardang. The Mardang was a singular drum with two sides played simultaneously. In the court of Guru Arjun Dev Ji there were two musicians, Sata and Balwand, who decided to create a new instrument by splitting the Mardang in half. This created two separate drums that would be played simultaneously and would be able to be tuned individually.

Taus 

One of the most fascinating Sikh instruments is the Taus. It is one of the most beautiful instruments in the world and the head of the instrument is shaped like a peacock. The 10th Guru of the Sikhs, Guru Gobind Singh Ji, named the instrument "Taus" as the word is Persian for peacock. This instrument was originally created by Guru Hargobind Sahib Ji it is significantly larger than other Sikh instruments. It is played with a bow and has 28–30 different strings. This allows the instrument to display an array of emotions and properly play the raags of Sri Guru Granth Sahib Ji.

Harmonium 
After the British invaded and colonized India in the 19th century, they introduced some of their instruments to the Sikh Community. One of these instruments was the Harmonium.

Tabla 
The second instrument was the Tabla. The tabla is meant to accompany the singer and the harmonium in Sikh kirtan.

Sinism (Korean shamanism) music 

Muak (무악) or Musok Eumak (무속 음악), is the traditional Korean shamanistic music performed at and during a shamanistic ritual, the Gut (굿).

Origin 
Geographically, the Korean peninsula can be divided into five shaman music areas based on musical dialects and instrumentation: the central, northwestern, eastern, southwestern, and Jeju Island areas.

Types of Sinism (Korean shamanism) music

Sinawi (시나위) 
Sinawi is a form of Korean improvisational ensemble music believed to evolve from the Jeolla province in southwestern Korea.

Sanjo (산조) 
Sanjo (music) is a style of Korean traditional music produced with improvised instrumental solos.

Gut (굿) 
Gut (굿) is the name for a shamanic ritual. During a ritual, there is a table with sacrificial offerings, known as gutsang (굿상), for the gods. Throughout the ritual, the dramatic performances or gut nori (굿 노리) are accompanied by music, song, and dance. Gut can be categorized into private and village rituals. Private rituals include well-wishing rituals, healing rituals, underworld entry rituals and shamanic initiation rituals. The purpose of village rituals are to maintain peace and promote communal unity, where the name of each ritual vary by region. In modern Korean society, the most common forms of gut are shamanic initiation rituals and rituals for the dead.

Mudang (무당) 
In contemporary South Korea, the shaman is known as the mudang (무당). The mudang is usually a woman and takes on the role as a mediator between spirits or gods and humans. Mudangs can be categorized into sessûmu (세쑤무) and kangshinmu (강신무). Sessûmu are mudang that inherit the right to perform shamanic rituals while kangshinmu are mudang who are intiatied into their status through a ceremony.

Instruments 
The instruments that are used in Korean shamanic rituals are called Muakgi (무악기). These instruments include:

 Janggu (장구), Hourless drum
 Bara (바라), Small cymbals
 Piri (피리), Reed flute
 Jeotdae (젓대) / Daegeum (대금), Large bamboo flute
 Haegeum (해금), Two-stringed zither
 Kkwaenggwari (꽹과리), Small gong
 Buk (북), Small drum

Contemporary Influence 
In the Korean contemporary dance scene, there are many productions portraying significant elements from traditional Korean shaman culture.

Taoist music 

Taoist music is the ceremonial music of Taoism. The importance of music in Taoist ceremony is demonstrated by revealing how central beliefs are reflected through elements of music such as instrumentation and rhythm. The principal belief of the Yin Yang is reflected in the categorization of musical tones. The two main tones of Taoist chanting are the Yin Tone and the Yang Tone. Taoist music can be found in every ceremonial occasion, including "Five Offerings" and the "Ode of Wishing for Longevity."

Instruments 
The instruments used in Taoist rituals are called Faqi. These instruments include:

 Magical sword
 Water jar
 Muyu
 Dangzi
 Yinqing, Guiding chime

Zoroastrian music 

Zoroastrian music is a genre of music that accompanies Zoroastrian traditions and rites.

See also

 Choir music
 Cantor
 Gospel music
 Liturgical music
 Music and politics
 Secular music
 Spiritual (music)
 World Sacred Music Festival

References

Further reading

External links 
 Gregorian chant, liturgical music (CD, scores, learning)
 The Gregorian chant of the abbeys of Provence in France (fr. with Translator)
 New England religious music
   Hibba's Web Anthology of Traditional Jewish Music
 Religious Music – Greek

 
Religion and the arts
Music genres